Robert Busnel (19 September 1914 – 15 March 1991) was a French professional basketball player, coach, and administrator. During his playing career, the 1.92 m (6'3 ") tall Busnel, played at the power forward position. He was made an Officer of the Legion of Honor, in 1989, and was awarded the Olympic Order, by the IOC, in 1990. He was awarded the Glory of Sport in 1994. He was inducted into the French Basketball Hall of Fame, in 2005. In 2007, he was enshrined as a contributor to the FIBA Hall of Fame.

Basketball playing career
During his playing career, Busnel played club basketball with FA Mulhouse, FC Grenoble, ESSMG Lyon, UA Marseille, and Racing Club de France.

Busnel played for the senior French national team, from 1934 to 1949. He played at the 1939 EuroBasket, the 1946 EuroBasket, the 1947 EuroBasket, and the 1949 EuroBasket, where he won a silver medal.

Basketball coaching career
Busnel coached the senior French national women's team, from 1945 to 1957. He won a bronze medal at the 1953 FIBA World Championship for Women. He also coached the senior French national men's team (1947–1957), winning a silver medal at the 1948 Summer Olympic Games, a silver medal at EuroBasket 1949 (he was a player-coach in that tournament), and bronze medals at EuroBasket 1951 and EuroBasket 1953.

In the 1965–66 season, he coached Real Madrid, on the club level.

Basketball administrative career
Busnel was the technical director (1960–1964), and President (1967–1980), of the French Basketball Federation. He was the President of the Standing Conference of Europe (now FIBA Europe), from 1976 to 1982. He served as a President of FIBA, in 1984–1990.

Personal life and death
Busnel received the Croix de Guerre 1939–1945. The French Basketball Cup is named after him, in his honor. Busnel, along with his wife Joëlle, and one of his nephews, died in an auto crash, in 1991, outside of Lyon.

Awards and accomplishments

Club playing career
7× French League Champion: (1930, 1931, 1943, 1944, 1946, 1948, 1951)

Club coaching career
French League Champion: (1951)
3× FIBA European Selection: (1964, 1966, 1967)
Spanish League Champion: (1966)
Spanish Cup Winner: (1966)

References

External links
 FIBA Player Profile
 FIBA Europe Player Profile
 FIBA Hall of Fame Profile
 Robert Busnel Profile

1914 births
1991 deaths
French men's basketball players
French basketball coaches
Sportspeople from Toulon
FIBA Hall of Fame inductees
Real Madrid basketball coaches
Basketball coaches of international teams
Officiers of the Légion d'honneur
Officers of the Ordre national du Mérite
Medalists at the 1948 Summer Olympics
Olympic silver medalists for France
Paris Racing Basket players
Paris Racing Basket coaches
Power forwards (basketball)
Union athlétique de Marseille players
ESSMG Lyon players
FC Grenoble basketball players
Foyer alsacien Mulhouse players